Psoromic acid is a β-orcinol depsidone with the molecular formula C18H14O8. Psoromic acid inhibits herpes simplex viruses type 1 and type 2. Furthermore it inhibits the RabGGTase. Psoromic acid occurs in antarctic lichens.

References

Further reading 

 
 
 
 

Lichen products
Heterocyclic compounds with 3 rings
Oxygen heterocycles
Carboxylic acids
Lactones
Ketones
Phenols
Methoxy compounds